French Creek may refer to:

Communities

Canada
French Creek, Alberta
French Creek (British Columbia)

United States
French Creek, former name of Frenchtown, El Dorado County, California
French Creek Township, Allamakee County, Iowa
French Creek, New York
French Creek Township, Pennsylvania (disambiguation)
French Creek, West Virginia
Upper French Creek, Wisconsin

Bodies of water

United States 
French Creek (Upper Iowa River tributary), Iowa
French Creek (Lake Itasca), Clearwater County, Minnesota
Frenchs Creek, North Carolina
French Creek (Black River), a stream in Lorain County, Ohio
French Creek (Allegheny River tributary), Pennsylvania & New York
French Creek (Schuylkill River tributary), Pennsylvania
French Creek (Cheyenne River), South Dakota
French Creek (Snohomish River), a stream in Washington
French Creek (Buckhannon River), West Virginia

Worldwide 
French Creek (British Columbia), British Columbia, Canada
French Creek (Malta), one of several inlets opening off Grand Harbour, Malta

Other
French Creek Council, Boy Scout council in Ohio and Pennsylvania
French Creek Farm, in Pennsylvania
French Creek Presbyterian Church, in West Virginia
French Creek State Park, in Pennsylvania
French Creek Wildlife Area, in Wisconsin
West Virginia State Wildlife Center, previously known as French Creek Game Farm, in West Virginia

See also
French Pete Creek, a tributary of the South Fork McKenzie River in Lane County, Oregon
Frenchman Creek (disambiguation)